Jan Tadeusz Masiel (born 28 March 1963 in Siemiatycze)
is a Polish politician. In the years 2004-2009 he was a
Member of the European Parliament (MEP) for the Greater Poland Voivodship
with the Self-Defense, a Non-Inscrit in the European Parliament.

Masiel was in a Committee on Employment and Social Affairs, and was a substitute
for the Committee on Petitions and the Committee on the Environment, Public Health and Food Safety. Masiel was also
a member of the Delegation to the EU-Romania Joint Parliamentary Committee.

Education
 Master of Psychology, Catholic University of Lublin (KUL)(1987)
 1993: Diploma in teaching French language from the Alliance Française, Brussels
 1997: Certificate of completion of a three-year programme in psychoanalytical psychotherapy with the Conseil de Formation Continue en Psychiatrie (CFCP) at the University of Louvain-la-Neuve

Career
 1990-1991: Traineeship in psychoanalytical psychiatry at the 'La Borde' Clinic, France
 Sociotherapist at the Les Tropiques Institute A.S.B.L
 1992-1997: in Brussels
 Self-employed in Brussels
 2004-2007: Member of 'Self-defence of the Polish Republic'

See also
 2004 European Parliament election in Poland

External links
 
 

1963 births
Living people
Self-Defence of the Republic of Poland MEPs
MEPs for Poland 2004–2009
Survivors of the 2008 Mumbai attacks